Anne-Elisabeth Moutet is a French journalist, writer and columnist. She writes for The Daily Telegraph in London particularly on international affairs.

Career 
Born in Paris, she began her career at the VSD of Maurice Siégel and Jean Gorini as a reporter, then a correspondent in the United States (1979-1981). She then joined France Soir, before joining the Sunday Times as a correspondent in Paris in 1983. She was head of the Paris office of the Sunday Telegraph  (London) from 1986 to 1989. After a stint at ELLE (French and British editions), she entered The European, becoming the head of the Paris office of the newspaper until 1998.

She joined The Daily Telegraph in 2007 as a columnist.

She wrote that Charles Enderlin's coverage of the Israeli-Palestinian conflict, particularly the killing of Muhammad al-Durrah was respected by other journalists but was regularly criticized by pro-Israel groups.

Contributions to other print media include:
 The Daily Telegraph
 The New York Post
 UnHerd

She has made television appearance for multiple channels, including:
 Arte
 BBC News
 LCI
 BFM TV
 GB News
 France 24
 La Chaîne Info
 CGTN
 CNEWS
 Österreichischer Rundfunk
 Deutsche Welle
 RT

Political positions 
She is a critic of Salafism. She described President of France Emmanuel Macron as "arrogant".

In January 2018, she is a signatory of a column published in Le Monde entitled “We defend a freedom to annoy, essential to sexual freedom” of a group of 100 women including actress Catherine Deneuve.

Personal life 
She is the granddaughter of Member of Parliament and former Popular Front (1936-1938) minister Marius Moutet.

References

External links 
 Moutet at The Daily Telegraph
 Twitter

Living people
Journalists from Paris
Political journalists
21st-century French women
Year of birth missing (living people)
French women journalists